Acheilognathus brevicaudatus is a species of freshwater ray-finned fish in the genus Acheilognathus.  It is endemic to China.

References

Acheilognathus
Fish described in 1987
Freshwater fish of China